I Hate Myself (for Loving You) is the ninth album by Thijs van Leer, released under the name Van Leer.

Track listing
 I Hate Myself (for Loving You) 4:43
 My Inspiration 4:37
 I Think of You 5:56
 Tempted 4:09
 Too Good to Be True 4:20
 Manchildren 4:43
 Hollywood Blues 6:00
 You Got Me 4:48
 Sensitive Boy 4:41
 Shock Treatment 5:22
 All Because of You 4:26 (bonus CD track)

Personnel
Peter Vlietstra – Drums
Bobby Jacobs – Bass
Jan Peter Eerenberg – Guitar
Luis Luz – Percussion
Michael Gillespie – Vocals, Guitar, Synthesizer
Thijs van Leer – Synthesizer, Piano, Organ, Flute

Guest musicians
Eet Albers – Guitar on 1 and 6
Frank auf dem Brink – Hi Hat on 1 and 6
Pietro Lacirignola – Saxophone on 8 and 9

Thijs van Leer albums
1987 albums